Bayonne is a city and commune in France.

Bayonne may also refer to:

Places

Europe
 Arrondissement of Bayonne, an arrondissement of France
 Bayonne, Spain, a municipality in Spain often referred to by its Galician name, Baiona

United States
 Bayonne, Nebraska, an unincorporated community in Nebraska, U.S.
 Bayonne, New Jersey, a city in New Jersey, U.S.
 Bayonne Bridge, connecting New Jersey and Staten Island, New York, U.S.

Dominican Republic
Bayona, a neighborhood in Santo Domingo, Dominican Republic.

People with the surname
 Gilbert Bayonne (born 1988), Haitian-American soccer player
 Pierre Bayonne (born 1949), Haitian footballer

Other uses
 Bayonne (musician), a musician from Austin, Texas

See also
 Battle of Bayonne, 1814
 Gare de Bayonne, a railway station in Bayonne, France
 Bayonne ham
 Baiona (disambiguation)
 Biarritz – Anglet – Bayonne Airport